Lamina Emergent Mechanisms (also known as LEMs) are more commonly referred to as "Pop-up Mechanisms" as seen in "pop-up-books". LEM is the technical term of such mechanisms or engineering. LEMs are a subset of compliant mechanisms fabricated from planar materials (lamina) and have motion emerging from the fabrication plane. LEMs use compliance, or the deflection of flexible members to achieve motion.

Background 
Ortho-Planar Mechanisms are an earlier concept similar to LEMs. More well known LEMs include pop-up books, flat-folding origami mechanisms, origami stents, and deployable mechanisms. The research in LEMs also overlaps with deployable structures, origami, kirigami, compliant mechanisms, microelectromechanical systems, packaging engineering, robotics, paper engineering, developable mechanisms, and more.

References

External links 
Compliant Mechanism Research Group at BYU
 Motion Structure research at Oxford
 Rigid Origami Structure research by Tomohiro Tachi
 Metamorphic Mechanism research at King's College London
 Robotic Origami Folding research at Carnegie Mellon

Mechanisms (engineering)
Robotics hardware
Paper folding